is a Japanese footballer who plays as a midfielder for Portuguese club Casa Pia.

Club career
Kunimoto joined Avispa Fukuoka in 2015.

On 9 January 2020, Kunimoto joined Jeonbuk Hyundai Motors. On 8 May, he made his first appearance against Suwon. On 28 June, he scored his first goal against Ulsan.

Career statistics
Updated to 6 July 2022.

Honours

Club 

Jeonbuk Hyundai Motors
K League 1 : 2020, 2021
KFA Cup : 2020

Notes

References

External links

Profile at Avispa Fukuoka

	

1997 births
Living people
Association football people from Fukuoka Prefecture
Japanese footballers
J1 League players
J2 League players
J3 League players
Avispa Fukuoka players
Gyeongnam FC players
Jeonbuk Hyundai Motors players
K League 1 players
J.League U-22 Selection players
Association football forwards
Japanese people of Korean descent

Japanese expatriate sportspeople in Portugal